Serivan Tappeh (also Romanized as Serīvān Tappeh) is a village in Badranlu Rural District, in the Central District of Bojnord County, North Khorasan Province, Iran. At the 2006 census, its population was 32, in 10 families.

References 

Populated places in Bojnord County